Łukasz Jankowski (born 7 December 1982, in Leszno, Poland) is a former motorcycle speedway rider from Poland.

Career
In 2002, he reached the final of the 2002 Speedway Under-21 World Championship.

He rode for the Poole Pirates in the British Elite League.

Family
He is the son of Roman Jankowski, a champion Polish speedway rider. His brothers Marcin Janowski and Norbert Janowski were also speedway riders.

Results

World Championships 
 Individual U-21 World Championship
 2002 -  Slaný - 7th place (9 pts)

Polish Championships 

 Individual Polish Championship
 2008 - 11th place in Quarter-Final D
 Individual U-21 Polish Championship
 2001 - Częstochowa - Bronze medal
 Team Polish Championship (Speedway Ekstraliga)
 2002 - Silver medal

References 

Living people
Polish speedway riders
Belle Vue Aces riders
Poole Pirates riders
1982 births
People from Leszno
Sportspeople from Greater Poland Voivodeship